The Rison Texaco Service Station is a historic automobile service station at 216 Main Street (corner of Third Street) in Rison, Arkansas.  It is a distinctive Art Deco structure built c. 1926.  Since 1990 it has housed a timber company.

The building was listed on the National Register of Historic Places in 2002.

See also
Rison Cities Service Station, an English Revival station just up the road
National Register of Historic Places listings in Cleveland County, Arkansas

References

Gas stations on the National Register of Historic Places in Arkansas
Art Deco architecture in Arkansas
Commercial buildings completed in 1926
National Register of Historic Places in Cleveland County, Arkansas
1926 establishments in Arkansas
Transportation in Cleveland County, Arkansas
Texaco